Thit Thit Myint (born 14 June 1957) is a Burmese politician who currently serves as a member of parliament in the Yangon Region Hluttaw for South Okkalapa Township No. 1 Constituency. She is a member of the National League for Democracy.

Early life and education
Thit was born on 14 June 1957 in Yangon, Myanmar to parents Soe Myint who is a member of the Pyithu Hluttaw (House of Representatives), which won in the 1990 Myanmar general election in South Okkalapa Township and Aye Kywe. She graduated B.A(Psy) from Yangon University.

Political career
In the 2015 Myanmar general election, she contested the Yangon Region Hluttaw from South Okkalapa Township No. 1 parliamentary constituency, winning a majority of 32,102 votes.

References

National League for Democracy politicians
1957 births
Living people
People from Yangon Region